Moses Hoge (February 15, 1752 – July 5, 1820) was a Presbyterian minister and educator and abolitionist. He served as the sixth President of Hampden–Sydney College.

Early life
Moses Hoge was born in Cedar Grove, Virginia to James and Nancy Hoge (née Griffiths) in 1752.

Career
Hoge prepared for the ministry under the traditional apprentice-style system. He had been pastor of the Presbyterian Church of Shepherdstown, Virginia (now West Virginia), for twenty years and was famous as a preacher, theological teacher, and tract-writer when he was elected President of Hampden–Sydney College in June 1807. From the start, Hoge's main interest was in training ministers, and his efforts laid the groundwork for the establishment of what became Union Theological Seminary at the South end of the College campus. Princeton gave both Hoge and former Hampden–Sydney president Archibald Alexander Doctorates of Divinity (D.D.) in 1810.

In 1820, after attending the American Bible Society convention in New York, Hoge attended the General Assembly of the Presbyterian Church in Philadelphia, where he died. During his trip, Hoge visited Princeton to see Samuel Stanhope Smith, the first president of Hampden–Sydney, whose preaching had helped lead him to the ministry over forty years earlier.

Hoge was known for his powerful, moving sermons. John Randolph of Roanoke, frequently went to hear Hoge preach. Randolph, in writing of Hoge said, "Doctor Hoge was the most eloquent man I ever heard in the pulpit or out of it." He was instrumental in founding Virginias only chapter of the American Colonization Society.

Personal life
He married Elizabeth Poage, August 23, 1783, daughter of John Poage of Staunton, Virginia – she was the mother of all of his children and died June 18, 1802. He later married Susan Hunt (born Susannah Watkins) on October 25, 1803.

Death and legacy
Hoge died on July 5, 1820. His third son, Samuel Davies Hoge, married Elizabeth Rice Lacy, daughter of Drury Lacy – the third president of Hampden–Sydney College.

References

1752 births
1820 deaths
19th-century American writers
Presidents of Hampden–Sydney College
Presbyterian Church in the United States of America ministers